Leptosiphon liniflorus is a species of flowering plant in the phlox family known by the common name narrowflower flaxflower.

It is native to the western United States from Washington and Idaho, through Oregon and Nevada, and across California.   It grows below , in many types of habitats, including chaparral, oak woodland, grasslands, yellow pine forest, and on serpentine soils.

Description

The bloom period is April to June.

References

External links
 Calflora Database: Leptosiphon liniflorus (Narrowflower flaxflower)
 Jepson Manual eFlora (TJM2) treatment of Leptosiphon liniflorus
UC CalPhotos gallery: Leptosiphon liniflorus

liniflorus
Flora of California
Flora of Nevada
Flora of the Northwestern United States
Natural history of the California chaparral and woodlands
Natural history of the California Coast Ranges
Natural history of the Central Valley (California)
Natural history of the Peninsular Ranges
Natural history of the Santa Monica Mountains
Natural history of the Transverse Ranges
Flora without expected TNC conservation status